Jon Lee is the name of:

 Jon Lee (drummer) (1968–2002), former drummer of Welsh rock band Feeder
 Jon Lee (actor) (born 1982), singer and actor, member of S Club 7
 Jon Lee (mathematician) (born 1960), professor at the University of Michigan
 Jon Lee (volleyball player) (born 1949), American volleyball player

See also
 John Lee (disambiguation)
 Jonathan Lee (disambiguation)